The Puddefjord Bridge is an arch bridge in Bergen, Norway.

The reinforced concrete bridge consists of two directly adjacent, near-identical bridges, the first of which was built in 1956 and the second in 1999. Norwegian National Road RV 555 crosses Puddefjord bridge over Damsgårdssundet into the tunnels Løvstakk tunnel (Løvstakktunnelen)  to Fyllingsdalen and Damsgårds tunnel (Damsgårdstunnelen) to Laksevåg.
The bridge carries six lanes of motor vehicles and two cycle/footpaths across the Puddefjorden in central Bergen, between Møhlenpris in the city centre and Gyldenpris in Årstad borough. Although it does not have official motorway status, it is an important part of the city's motorway network, linking the westbound motorway, Sotraveien, to European route E39.

The bridge was important in the development of the valley of Fyllingsdalen, which was annexed by Bergen in 1955. It also served as a more convenient road to the city centre for the residents of Laksevåg, who prior to its construction had to drive through Danmarksplass or take the ferry across the Puddefjord.

As of 2012, the bridge carried a daily average traffic of 56,098 vehicles.

References

External links
 Puddefjordsbroen (Structurae 1999)

Deck arch bridges
Road bridges in Bergen
1956 establishments in Norway
Bridges completed in 1956
Former toll bridges in Norway